Kadarići may refer to the following villages in Bosnia and Herzegovina:

 Kadarići (Ilijaš), in the municipality of Ilijaš, in the Sarajevo Canton
 Kadarići (Vareš), in the municipality of Vareš, in the Zenica-Doboj Canton